Vandi is a surname. Notable people with the surname include:

Alfio Vandi (born 1955), Italian cyclist
Despina Vandi (born 1969), Greek singer
Isa Vandi (born 1960), Iranian-Swedish film director and producer
Sante Vandi (1653–1716), Italian Baroque painter

Other uses
Vandi (film), a 2018 Tamil-language action film

See also
Vandy (disambiguation)